The 2015 Women's European Volleyball League was the seventh edition of the annual Women's European Volleyball League and featured women's national volleyball teams from six European countries. 

Hungary won their first title after defeating Turkey 15–13 in the golden set. Renáta Sándor from the winning team was named Most Valuable Player.

Teams

Results
All times are local.

Standings

|}

Leg 1

|}

Leg 2

|}

Leg 3

|}

Leg 4

|}

Leg 5

|}

Final round
All times are local.

Semifinals

|}

Final

|}

Final standings

Awards
MVP:  Renáta Sándor

References

External links
Official website

2015 Women
European Volleyball League